Alcalá de los Gazules is a city and municipality located in the province of Cádiz, Spain. According to the 2006 census, the town has a population of 5,633 inhabitants. Alcalá de los Gazules is situated in the Sierra de Cádiz.

Although not officially one of the pueblos blancos, Alcalá is still listed, since 1984, as having Artistic-Historic status.

History 
Alcalá de los Gazules was first populated by the Romans in CE189 and supplied them with food, oil, wine, and metal.  During Roman occupation, the city was known as Lascuta. As the Roman empire weakened, the Vandals moved in and renamed the area Valdalusia but they lasted only twenty years, 409–429.  They were followed by the Visigoths who left behind the impressive tower, the Mesa de Esparragal.

For many years until the Catholic Ferdinand and Isabella took control, at the end of the 15th century of the last Muslim kingdom in the south of Spain, there was a demarcation line between the Islamic and Christian regions, along which sat towns that are now known as the pueblos blancos, the white towns, and Alcalá was on the border.  Many of these towns were fortified and Alcalá has a number of towers around its perimeter, now fallen into disrepair.

Following the Catholic consolidation in Spain, many mosques were knocked down and in Alcalá, the famous church of San Jorge in the top square was built in the mid-16th century on top of the ruins of the old mosque.

During the Peninsular Wars in 1809 a mounted militia from Alcalá made a successful ambush on some nearby French troops.  A year later General Manbourg's troops took revenge by cutting the throats of the entire population and blowing up the castle.

Demographics

Monuments and sights
Yacimiento Laja de los Hierros.
Yacimiento romano de la Mesa del Esparragal.
Depósitos romanos de la Salada.
Casa del Cabildo.
Iglesia Mayor Parroquial de San Jorge
Convento de Santa Clara.
Iglesia de San Francisco (Iglesia de la Victoria).
Convento de Santo Domingo.
Ermita-Santuario de Ntra. Sra. de los Santos.
Los Pozos.
Fuente de la Salada.
Puente Romano.
Casas señoriales.
Las tres torres.
Ermita de Nuestra Señora de los Santos
Church of La Victoria

Celebrations
Carnaval de Alcalá de los Gazules (late February-early March).
Semana Santa (the week leading up to Easter).
Festividad de San Jorge (23 April).
Concurso de Cante Flamenco (July).
International Classical Music Festival "Al-Kalat" (mid-August).
Feria de agosto (late August).
Romería de Nuestra Señora de los Santos (early September).
Octava de Nuestra Señora de los Santos.

Economy
Cork production
Agriculture
Beef cattle
Goats' Cheese production
Tourism
Hunting

Native people
Alejandro Sanz
Bibiana Aído
Alfonso Perales

Gallery

See also
Los Alcornocales Natural Park

References

External links 

  Ayuntamiento de Alcalá de los Gazules
  Alcalá de los Gazules – Sistema de Información Multiterritorial de Andalucía

Municipalities of the Province of Cádiz
Populated places established in the 2nd century